Silya Magnana (born March 16, 1991, in Béjaïa) is an Algerian international volleyball player, playing as setter.

Club information

Current club :   MB Bejaia

Previous club :  ASW Bejaia

Previous club :  NCB Bejaia

See also
Algeria women's national volleyball team

References

1991 births
Living people
Algerian women's volleyball players
Volleyball players from Béjaïa
Setters (volleyball)
21st-century Algerian people